William Elliot Kyle, (13 July 1881, Hawick, Scotland – ) was a Scottish rugby union player, who played as a forward.

He also played for Hawick RFC.

References

 
 Bath, Richard, ed (2007). The Scotland Rugby Miscellany. Vision Sports. .
 Jones, J.R. (1976) Encyclopedia of Rugby Union Football. Robert Hale, London, .

1881 births
1959 deaths
Hawick RFC players
Rugby union players from Hawick
Scotland international rugby union players
Scottish rugby union players
Rugby union forwards